A squamous intraepithelial lesion (SIL) is an abnormal growth of epithelial cells on the surface of the cervix, commonly called squamous cells. This condition can lead to cervical cancer, but can be diagnosed using a Pap smear or a colposcopy. It can be treated by using methods that remove the abnormal cells, allowing normal cells to grow in their place. In the Bethesda system, the cytology can be graded as LSIL (low-grade squamous intraepithelial lesion) or HSIL (high-grade squamous intraepithelial lesion).

References 

Papillomavirus-associated diseases